Cedric Nicolas-Troyan (born 9 March 1969) is a French film director and visual effects artist.

Filmography
Director
 Carrot vs Ninja (2011) (Short film)
 The Huntsman: Winter's War  (2016)
 Kate (2021)

Second Unit Director
 Snow White and the Huntsman (2012)
 Maleficent (2014)

Visual effects

References

External links 
 

Living people
French film directors
Visual effects artists
People from Talence
1969 births